The Denmark Democrats, officially DanmarksdemokraterneInger Støjberg, is a Danish political party founded in June 2022 by Inger Støjberg. In the 2022 election, the Denmark Democrats won 14 seats, thereby making them the 5th largest party alongside Liberal Alliance in the Folketing.

History 

The party was founded in June 2022 by Inger Støjberg who had served variously as the minister for immigration, housing and gender equality in the Folketing for Venstre before she was impeached for misconduct in office after separating families in migrant centres and was accused of disloyalty within her party. According to Støjberg, her new movement would be a right-wing party with a strict immigration policy, but at the time of its founding there was no actual party platform. In July, the party was formally registered after obtaining the necessary voter declarations on 1 July, eight days after the party was founded.

That same month, Members of the Folketing Peter Skaarup, Jens Henrik Thulesen Dahl, Bent Bøgsted, and Hans Kristian Skibby announced that they wished to join the Denmark Democrats. These four were originally elected to the Folketing for the Danish People's Party (DPP) but had since become independents before joining the party. Skaarup was admitted as a member on 28 July 2022, giving the party its first seat in the Folketing.

In August 2022, nine local councilors defected to the party, including former local members of the Conservative People's Party.

Platform and policies 

In the interview in which Støjberg announced her leadership of the party, she stated: "I think that what is missing is a borgerlig [bourgeois or middle-class] party that takes care of the interests of the majority of people. And that has a clear view of everything that goes on outside of Copenhagen. I think that the connecting lines between Copenhagen and the rest of Denmark are becoming weak." She also stated one of the main focuses of the party would be to review Denmark's immigration policy.

Media commentators have described the party as deriving its name and policy ideas from the neighboring Sweden Democrats party. Journalist Theodoros Benakis opined that the party is right-wing populist, anti-immigration, and eurosceptic in its beliefs.

On its website and early policy brief, the party seeks to improve conditions for the elderly, young people, and small and medium-sized companies. It also aims to combat what it describes as overbearing bureaucracy from the European Union (EU) on Denmark and wants to further decentralize power to regions outside of the capital. It also wants to increase funding for the police and calls for compulsory policies for immigrants to adapt to Danish culture. In an updated policy platform, the Denmark Democrats stated its objectives to be removing all EU influence on Danish pension, tax and maternity leave policies, tougher regulation on car leasing companies, tax deductions for workers who commute above certain distances, removing VAT on energy bills, changes to the Danish education system to encourage more vocational training, and reforms and cuts to Denmark's foreign aid and government funded arts budgets.

Election results

Parliament

References

Political parties established in 2022
2022 establishments in Denmark
Anti-immigration politics in Europe
Conservative liberal parties
Conservative parties in Denmark
Liberal parties in Denmark
Nationalist parties in Denmark
Right-wing parties in Europe
Right-wing populism in Denmark
Right-wing populist parties
Eurosceptic parties